Marlow railway station serves the town of Marlow in Buckinghamshire, England.

History
The terminus was originally named Great Marlow. The branch was absorbed by the GWR on 6 August 1897. On 14 February 1899, the station was renamed "Marlow".

There was a proposal to extend the branch westwards to Henley-on-Thames, but the plan was met with local opposition.

British Rail opened the present station on 10 July 1967 on the site of the goods yard of the original station. The original station was then closed, demolished and its site redeveloped.

When this service was withdrawn north of Bourne End in 1970, Marlow station became the terminus of the Marlow Branch Line which leaves the main Great Western Main Line at Maidenhead.

The service on the branch line is known locally as the "Marlow Donkey", which is commemorated by a local pub of the same name, although the origin of the term is unclear.

Services
Services are provided by Great Western Railway; at peak times these shuttle between Marlow and Bourne End every 30 minutes, but off-peak and at weekends they run through to Maidenhead once per hour, reversing at Bourne End.  The trip typically takes 23 minutes.

Notes

References

External links

Railway stations in Buckinghamshire
DfT Category F1 stations
Former Great Western Railway stations
Railway stations in Great Britain opened in 1873
Railway stations served by Great Western Railway
Marlow, Buckinghamshire